Westmacott could refer to:

Charles Molloy Westmacott, (c.1788–1868), British journalist and author
Captain Herbert Westmacott, (died 1980), British special forces officer killed in action 
James Sherwood Westmacott, (1823–1900), British sculptor
Mary Westmacott, an alias of Agatha Christie
Mike Westmacott (1925–2012), British mountaineer
Percy G. B. Westmacott (1830–1917), British mechanical engineer
Sir Peter Westmacott (born 1950),  LVO, British diplomat
Richard Westmacott (disambiguation), several people
 Richard Westmacott (the elder) (1747–1808), British monument sculptor
 Richard Westmacott (1775–1856), British sculptor
 Richard Westmacott (the younger) (1799–1872), British sculptor
 Richard Westmacott (Indian Army officer) (1841–1925), British military officer